Thomas Scott Leslie (26 February 1884 – 27 August 1961) was a Scottish footballer who played for Vale of Clyde, Tottenham Hotspur, Leyton, New Brompton, Clyde and Caerphilly.

Football career 
Leslie began his playing career at Vale of Clyde before joining Tottenham Hotspur in 1908. The defender played a total of 12 matches for Spurs between 1908 and 1911. He went on to make appearances at Leyton, New Brompton, Clyde (on a short loan during World War I, during which the Scottish Football League continued) and finally Caerphilly.

References 

1880s births
1948 deaths
Footballers from Glasgow
Scottish footballers
Scottish Junior Football Association players
English Football League players
Southern Football League players
Clyde F.C. wartime guest players
Scottish Football League players
Tottenham Hotspur F.C. players
Vale of Clyde F.C. players
Leyton F.C. players
Gillingham F.C. players
Caerphilly F.C. players
Association football defenders